HMS Hazard was a 14-gun  sloop launched in 1744. She was captured in November 1745 by Jacobite forces in Montrose harbour and was sailed to Dunkirk and was renamed Le Prince Charles.

Reverting to her previous name Hazard, she was sold in 1749.

References

 McLaughlan, Ian. The Sloop of War 1650–1763. Seaforth Publishing, 2014. .
 Winfield, Rif. British Warships in the Age of Sail 1714–1792: Design, Construction, Careers and Fates. Seaforth Publishing, 2007. .

1744 ships
Sloops of the Royal Navy
Ships built in Deptford
Jacobite rising of 1745